Andheri station may refer to:

 Andheri railway station, a railway station at Andheri suburb of Mumbai
 Andheri metro station, a metro station interconnecting the railway station of same name